Étienne Poulin (June 27, 1835 – October 25, 1901) was a farmer and political figure in Quebec. He represented Rouville in the Legislative Assembly of Quebec from 1881 to 1886 as a Conservative.

He was born in Sainte-Marie-de-Monnoir, Lower Canada, the son of Étienne Poulin and Charlotte Hébert, and was educated at the Collège de Saint-Hyacinthe. In 1854, he married Marcelline Vigeant. Poulin was president of the school board for Marieville from 1868 to 1871 and from 1881 to 1882. He was mayor of Sainte-Marie-de-Monnoir in 1882. He was defeated when he ran for reelection in 1886 and 1890 and again in Iberville in 1897. He died in Sainte-Marie-de-Monnoir at the age of 66.

His older brother Joseph-Napoléon served in the legislative assembly and legislative council for the Province of Canada.

References
 

Conservative Party of Quebec MNAs
Mayors of places in Quebec
1835 births
1901 deaths